In Spanish poetry, a silva is a poetic form consisting of in eleven- and seven- syllable lines: hendecasyllables (endecasílabos) and heptasyllables (heptasílabos), the majority of which are rhymed although there is no fixed order or rhyme, nor is there a fixed number of lines. Silvas are used by persons of high rank, usually in soliloquies, and for highly emotional narration and description. 

The use of the silva can be found in Luis de Góngora's Soledades.

External links
Spanish Metrification By A. Robert Lauer

Poetic forms